Queffélec is a French surname. Notable people with this name include:
Amanda Queffélec-Maruani (born 1978), French novelist, playwright, screenwriter and filmmaker
Henri Queffélec (1910–1992), French writer and screenwriter
Anne Queffélec (born 1948), French pianist, daughter of Henri
Martine Queffélec (born 1949), French mathematician, daughter-in-law of Henri
Yann Queffélec (born 1949), French novelist, son of Henri
Thierry Queffelec, Administrator Superior of Wallis and Futuna